María Josefa Ascargorta y Rivera (circa 1800 Madrid - 1850 ) was a Spanish painter.

Life 
She studied art at the Drawing Studio for Ladies on Calle de Fuencarral, a part of the Real Academia de Bellas Artes de San Fernando,  where she studied with Vicente López Portaña .  The quality of her drawings caught the attention of his teachers, who presented them to the Ordinary Meeting of the Academy on 23 January 1820.   On 27 November 1821, she was appointed with  Luisa Marchori, the work of proofreader with an endowment of 1,000 reales per year.   

She submitted an application to the Royal Academy of Fine Arts of San Fernando; she executed a copy of a Christ of the Nazarene , by Luis de Morales , still in the Royal Academy.  However, after a secret vote, the commission deliberated and granted her only the rank of supernumerary on 2 November 1828.

Luisa Marchori, a student of Juan Antonio Ribera , also received the same honor. In a letter from María Josefa Ascargorta to the Secretary of the Royal Academy of San Fernando stated:

References 

1850 deaths
Spanish painters